Orthocis juglandis is a species of tree-fungus beetle in Ciidae family which can be found in Austria, Bosnia and Herzegovina, Kosovo, Montenegro, Serbia, and Voivodina.

References

Beetles described in 1885
Beetles of Europe
Ciidae